Emilio Martín Hidalgo Conde (born June 15, 1976), commonly known as Martín Hidalgo is a Peruvian football coach and a former player who played as a left wingback .

Club career
In late August 2006, he was signed by the current champions of the Copa Libertadores de América, SC Internacional, on loan from the Paraguayan club Libertad until August 30, 2007.

International career
He is a former member of the national team, and has played 37 matches and scored 2 goals since his debut on March 7, 1996.

Honours
FIFA Club World Cup: 2006
Recopa Sudamericana: 2007
Peruvian Championship: 1995, 1996, 2004
Paraguayan Championship: 2006

References

External links

 

1976 births
Living people
Footballers from Lima
Association football fullbacks
Peruvian footballers
Peru international footballers
Sporting Cristal footballers
UD Las Palmas players
Club Atlético Vélez Sarsfield footballers
Club Atlético Colón footballers
FC Saturn Ramenskoye players
Club Alianza Lima footballers
Club Libertad footballers
Sport Club Internacional players
Grêmio Foot-Ball Porto Alegrense players
Deportivo Táchira F.C. players
FBC Melgar footballers
Cienciano footballers
1997 Copa América players
2001 Copa América players
2004 Copa América players
Peruvian Primera División players
La Liga players
Russian Premier League players
Argentine Primera División players
Paraguayan Primera División players
Peruvian expatriate footballers
Expatriate footballers in Argentina
Expatriate footballers in Paraguay
Expatriate footballers in Brazil
Expatriate footballers in Spain
Expatriate footballers in Venezuela
Peruvian expatriate sportspeople in Brazil